James Horncastle is an English sportswriter and a broadcaster. Specialising in European and Italian football, Horncastle frequently covers football for BT Sport.

Horncastle speaks fluent Italian  having formerly lived in Rome. Horncastle started writing Serie B match reports for the Football Italia website and is now a  regular weekly pundit for BT Sport on their Champions League Goals Show and appeared weekly on their European Football Show for four years.

As well as appearing weekly on British television Horncastle writes in English and Italian. He has written for The Guardian, the Daily Mirror, The Daily Telegraph, The Times, The Independent, The Blizzard, Eurosport and the Liverpool Echo

He was reported by Forbes to be the first to break the $828m deal for A.C. Milan by Chinese investors from Silvio Berlusconi.

He is used weekly as a European expert for BBC Radio 5 Live’s Euro leagues show with Mina Rzouki, Julien Laurens, and Raphael Honigstein. He also produces columns for  BBC Sport.

He has contributed to Talksport, The Anfield Wrap, ESPN, the A.S. Roma website, Off The Ball and FourFourTwo.

For The Football Ramble Horncastle contributes weekly to their ‘On The Continent’ podcast. Horncastle was a regular on the Football Weekly podcast and live shows.

He is now a regular on ‘Golazzo’ for The Totally Football Show with James Richardson and Gabriele Marcotti and has appeared as a guest at Totally Football live shows in England  and Ireland. He has appeared on the panel at Gazzetta Football Italia live shows with James Richardson.

He is a Leeds United fan.

References

Living people
English sports journalists
English podcasters
Sportspeople from Kingston upon Hull
Year of birth missing (living people)